Tie the Knot (literally, "Mommy's Boyfriend") is a 2014 Taiwanese romantic-comedy television series. The television drama was produced by Sanlih E-Television (SETTV), with Cheryl Yang as the female lead and Nylon Chen and Kingone Wang as the male leads. Shooting began on May 9, 2014, and the first episode aired on May 28, 2014 on SETTV.

Plot
Li Xiao Mei (Cheryl Yang) is a career woman who has a new boss, Huang Shi Jia (Nylon Chen), at the wedding-planning firm where she works. Ironically, she finds it difficult to find a man to marry because of past experiences with her father, but she has had a child using donated sperm and is raising the girl by herself. Wedding gown designer Liu Zi Jun (Kingone Wang) and her boss, Shi Jia, start to fall in love with her and each one tries to win her over.

Cast
Main cast

Cheryl Yang (楊謹華) as Li Xiao Mei (厲曉玫)
Nylon Chen (陳乃榮) as Huang Shi Jia (黃世家)
Kingone Wang (王傳一) as Liu Zi Jun (留子俊)
Dou Dou (豆豆) as Li Hao Hao (厲好好)
Tao Man Man (陶嫚曼) as Huang Shi Ting (黃世婷)
Sun Qi Jun (孫其君) as Ou Ping Kang (歐品康)

Minor cast
Zhang Pei Hua (張佩華) as Huang Hong Yuen (黃鴻元)
Yang Li-yin (楊麗音) as Wang Yi Qin (王憶琴)
Chen Zhi Qiang (陳志強) as Ma Lian Chuan (馬兩傳)
Liu Yu Jing (劉宇菁) as You Zhi Lin (尤芷琳)
Zeng Wei Lin (曾威菱) as Xie Ya Fei (謝雅妃)
Guan Jing Zong (管謹宗) as Manager v總經理)
Di Zhi Jie (狄志杰) as Li Xiao Long (厲曉龍)
Yao Han Yi (瑤涵沂) as Zhu Jia Zhen (朱桂珍)
Shen Hai Rong (沈海蓉) as Song Jin Yu (宋金玉)
Shen Meng-sheng (沈孟生) as Li Cheng Gong 厲成功
Amanda Chou (周曉涵) as Rima

Production
The series marked the first time that singer Nylon Chen had landed a leading role. In preparation for his acting break, Chen stepped up his exercise regime, running and training in the gym, as well as dieting to improve his fitness.

Cheryl Yang returned to SETTV after four years away from the network; she had appeared in a succession of female lead roles on other networks since her career break on My Queen in 2009. She again took on the role of a mother, having previously starred as a single mother in the 2012 series Once Upon a Love.

The series mainly filmed at Minsheng Pavilion (民生館進行劇中場地) and Amazing Hall (晶宴會館) in Taiwan; these locations were used as banquet halls and wedding reception venues for the characters.

Broadcast

Soundtrack

The Tie the Knot Original Soundtrack (媽咪的男朋友 電視原聲帶) CD was released on September 5, 2014 by Universal Music Taiwan. It contains 12 songs performed by various artists, including five original songs and seven instrumental versions. The opening theme song is "打呼" or "Snore" by Will Pan and Rainie Yang, while the closing theme song, "每一次戀愛" or "Every Time I Fall In Love", is by Rachel Liang.

Track listing

Episode ratings
The pilot episode of Tie the Knot ranked fifth amongst the television shows airing in the same time slot. It went up to the fourth spot on the day the second episode aired, and stayed at that spot until the end of the series, with the exception of the tenth week. The total viewer average garnered a rating of 1.22 percent. Its drama competitors were SETTV's Ordinary Love; FTV's Dragon Dance; TTV's Monga Woman, Super M, and Sun After The Rain; CTV's Happiness on the Moon and Perfect Couple; CTS' Unique Flavor and 綜藝王見王; and DaAi TV's 幸福魔法師, 頂坡角上的家, and 情牽萬里. The viewers survey was conducted by AGB Nielsen.

Awards

References

External links
 Tie the Knot on SETTV
 Tie the Knot on Eastern Integrated Taiwan
 

Eastern Television original programming
Sanlih E-Television original programming
2014 Taiwanese television series debuts
2014 Taiwanese television series endings
Taiwanese romantic comedy television series
Parenting television series